The November 29 National Liberation Movement (in Spanish: Movimiento de Liberación Nacional 29 de noviembre) (MLN-29) is a Marxist-Leninist party in Panama that was founded in 1970. The date in its name refers to the death of Panamanian communist leader Floyd Britton the year before.

History
Two years before its founding, on October 11 a military coup took power in Panama, and within days hundreds of leftists around the country had been arrested. Britton was one of the few that was killed during his incarceration, but by 1970 most had been released. The two biggest left-wing resistance groups at the time were the Movimiento Unidad Revolucionario (Revolutionary United Movement) and the older Vanguardia de Accion Nacional/Vanguard of National Action, both descended from the Partido del Pueblo de Panamá/People's Party of Panama, the country's oldest Marxist party and its Moscow-affiliated group. VAN and MUR were both heavily influenced by Maoism and the strategy and politics to come out of the Cuban revolution, and Britton himself had argued that Panama's left should not be beholden to any other country's government or politics, but that these two distinct ideological tendencies should be fused together with the Panamanian radical consciousness.

In 1970, VAN and MUR merged to form the Frente de Resistencia Popular (Popular Resistance Front), and in its founding congress in July of that year, it merged with smaller groups and changed its name to MLN-20. A student group, Frente Estudiantil Revolucionario/Revolutionary Student Front (FER-29), which had connections with the other groups, eventually joined in as a youth group and added the date of Britton's death to their name as well.

The radical elements of Panama's left had up until the coup focused their struggle to anti-imperialism against the United States and class struggle against the national bourgeoisie, along with struggles against racism and sexism. While these causes were still fundamental to the MLN-20, its focus at its founding was against the military dictatorship of Omar Torrijos. The other major tendency of resistance movements against Torrijos was loosely associated with the fascist former presidency of Arnulfo Arias. The MLN-20 attempted to gain contacts with the campesino base of some of these movements, but little coordination resulted, in large part due to the huge political differences. 

As the leading militant force against the regime in Panama, the MLN-20 saw its first few years using urban guerrilla tactics, but while some assaults on soldiers and bank expropriations saw success, there was little organizing amongst the masses. As militants were captured and killed, the MLN-20 became so weak that it entered a dormant phase in which some fled into temporary exile, while others remained to quietly expand base support. In ensuing years, two supporters committed self-immolation in front of the U.S. Embassy to protest both the regime and the United States.

An amnesty was declared, and many of the exiles returned in 1980. FER-29 had fared much better over the previous decade, and was quickly mobilized to support a resurgence of MLN-29 organizing. The MLN-29 attempted to organize a meeting with all of the other, mostly much smaller Marxist groups, with varying results. It was at this point that the group formally decided to temporarily end its armed efforts. The MLN-29 spread its influence in a variety of different industries, poor barrios, areas of the countryside, schools, and professions. It also formed ties with Marxist revolutionaries in other countries, and some members went on to fight in the Sandinistas and the FMLN, and it continued to train militarily in preparation for the return to the armed struggle.

Security problems and repression from the regime of Manuel Noriega still kept it too weak to attempt anything so ambitious, though. Opposing much of the late 1980s movement against Noriega as bourgeois and United States-influenced, the MLN-29 continued to organize poor and working class opposition. Meanwhile, the anti-Noreaga Civic Crusade claimed that the MLN-29 was with Noriega, and Noriega counter-claimed that it was with the Civic Crusade.

As a looming United States invasion became more certain, the MLN-29 decided to make ties with the leftist tendency within the military regime's ruling Democratic Revolutionary Party (Partido Revolucionario Democrático), but these ties were cut and the PRD undercut efforts by the MLN-29 to get arms to defend Panama against an invasion, knowing full well that after any attempted invasion those arms would then be used against the military regime. 

When the United States carried out its Operation Just Cause invasion of Panama, the MLN-29, FER-29, and influential sympathizers organized the first protests.

Since then, the MLN-29 has continued ties with other Marxist revolutionaries in Latin America, and been one of the leading opposition forces through the country's labor unions, public schools, and other sectors, and was one of the organizers of FRENADESO and the huge movements to defend social security, electric utilities and other sectors from privatization.

Communist parties in Panama
Political parties established in 1970